A statue of the Scottish politician Donald Dewar stands on Buchanan Street in Glasgow city centre. The statue was unveiled on 7 May 2002 by the Prime Minister of the United Kingdom, Tony Blair. It was sculpted by Kenny Mackay. The statue is 9 feet in height. Dewar is depicted wearing spectacles and his "characteristic stoop and crumpled suit".

The statue was unveiled on 7 May 2002 by the Prime Minister of the United Kingdom, Tony Blair in front of a crowd of several hundred people.

At the unveiling of the statue Blair said that Dewar's " ... compassion, his fundamental decency and his deep sense of social justice defined his entire approach as a politician" and described him as a "transforming moderate". The former leader of Scottish Labour, Wendy Alexander, said that the statue was " ... magnificent, the setting and the angle of it ...It's wonderful but it's not what he was when he was at his most exhausted".

References

2002 establishments in Scotland
2002 sculptures
Bronze sculptures in Scotland
Statues of politicians
Monuments and memorials in Glasgow
Outdoor sculptures in Scotland
Sculptures of men in the United Kingdom